Sorkheh Lizeh (also Romanized as Sorkheh Līzeh; also known as Sorkheh Līzeh Meleh Shābānān, Sorkheh Neyzār, Sorkheh Yazar, and Sorkheh Yezār) is a village in Koregah-e Gharbi Rural District, in the Central District of Khorramabad County, Lorestan Province, Iran. At the 2006 census, its population was 360, in 63 families.

References 

Towns and villages in Khorramabad County